Karin Peschel (25 October 1935 – 19 June 2020) was a German economist and university teacher at the University of Kiel. From 1992 to 1996, she served as rector of the university, the first woman to occupy this position.

Peschel died on 19 June 2020, aged 84.

References

1935 births
2020 deaths
People from Leipzig
German economists
German women economists
Place of death missing
Regional economists